Mount Tampomas is a small andesitic stratovolcano in West Java, Indonesia.  Young lava flows are found on the eastern flank of the volcano.

The mountain was used as a source of construction rock to build the nearby Mrica Hydroelectric Dam project.
Tampomas means "without gold" in Sundanese. The mountain is locally known as Agro Gusti Kencanawati and a lady spirit resides there. The legend says that a royal couple once had an argument and their spirits lay in the two rock outcrops side by side for eternity. The nearby mountain is where the male spirit is supposed to reside.

See also 

 List of volcanoes in Indonesia

References 

Stratovolcanoes of Indonesia
Volcanoes of West Java
Sumedang Regency